Nezahualcóyotl is a station on Line B of the Mexico City Metro system.  It is located in Ciudad Nezahualcóyotl in the State of Mexico adjacent to Mexico City.

The logo for the station is the head of a coyote since Nezahualcóyotl is Nahuatl for "hungry coyote", it is similar to the seal of Ciudad Nezahualcóyotl.  The station was opened on 30 November 2000.

From 2000 to 2002 the station name was Continentes (Spanish for "continents"), due to the station being near the Boulevard de los Continentes, and the icon of the station was a Mollweide projection. In 2002, it was decided to change the name of the station to Nezahualcóyotl, to reflect the name of the municipality that is crossed by this specific station.

Exits
North: Av. Central and Boulevard de los Continentes, Col. Vergel de Guadalupe
Northeast: Av. Central and Boulevard de los Continentes, Col. Vergel de Guadalupe
South: Av. Central and Av. Jorge Jiménez Cantú, Col. Vergel de Guadalupe
Southeast: Av. Central and Av. Jorge Jiménez Cantú, Col. Vergel de Guadalupe

Ridership

References 

Mexico City Metro Line B stations
Railway stations opened in 2000
Ciudad Nezahualcóyotl
2000 establishments in Mexico
Mexico City Metro stations outside Mexico City
Accessible Mexico City Metro stations